Adele Rivero (March 10, 1908 – May 5, 1992) was an American chess player. She won the first U.S Women's Chess Champion and held the title twice, in 1937 and 1940.

Born Adolphine Octaire Permereur in Antwerp, Belgium to Edward Permereur and Marguerite Braun Permereur, she initially came to the United States in 1916. She was married in New York in 1931 (and then divorced) to a Spanish man named Dorotes D. Rivero. She initially learned chess because her husband told her that "women didn't have the brains for the game".

In 1941, she lost her title to Mona May Karff. The day just before, Adele remarried, to Donald Belcher. She was Vermont champion in 1954.

External links
 http://www.edochess.ca/batgirl/Women_in_Chess_2.html#3.
 http://www.chess.com/blog/batgirl/adele

1908 births
1992 deaths
American female chess players
Belgian emigrants to the United States
Sportspeople from Antwerp
20th-century chess players
Date of death missing
20th-century American women
20th-century American people